Mesir may refer to:
 Egypt
 Mesir, Indonesia, a village in the East Aceh Regency of Indonesia
 Mesir, Iran, a village in the Isfahan Province of Iran